François Campaux, (14 April 1906 in Auxerre- 8 August 1983 in Paris), was a French film director, screenwriter and playwright.

Filmography

Director 
 1946 : Henri Matisse (short film)  
 1949 : Night Round
 1951 : Beautiful Love (or Le calvaire d'une mère)
 1953 : Grand Gala

Screenwriter 
 1938 : Mirages by Alexandre Ryder
 1942 : The Blue Veil by Jean Stelli
 1943 : The White Waltz by Jean Stelli
 1946 : Henri Matisse (short film) by himself
 1951 : Bel Amour (film) by himself
 1951 : The Blue Veil by Curtis Bernhardt
 1953 : Grand Gala by himself
 1956 : Mannequins of Paris by André Hunebelle
 1973 : Vidita negra by Rogelio A. González
 1974 : Agapi mou Oua-Oua by Giannis Dalianidis
 1979 : Tesoro mio by Giulio Paradisi

Theater 
 1963 : Des enfants de cœur, directed by Christian-Gérard, 
 1966 :  : Chérie noire, directed by François Campaux and Pierre Sabbagh, at Théâtre Marigny

External links 
 

French film directors
20th-century French screenwriters
French dramatists and playwrights
People from Auxerre
1906 births
1983 deaths